WITK is an AM radio station licensed by the U.S. Federal Communications Commission (FCC) to serve the community of Pittston, Pennsylvania. WITK broadcasts at 1550 kHz and covers much of northeastern Pennsylvania, including Scranton and Wilkes-Barre.  The station airs various Christian religious programming.  WITK is owned by Steel City Radio, Inc.  The station was sold in 2007 by Lackawanna County Commissioner Robert C. Cordaro. Steel City Radio, Inc. is part of the Wilkins Communications Network, Inc. of Spartanburg, South Carolina, whose owners,  Robert and Luann Wilkins, own 15 other stations in cities such as WWNL (Pittsburgh, Pennsylvania), WYYC (York, Pennsylvania), KCNW (Kansas City, Missouri), WELP (Greenville, South Carolina), WBRI (Indianapolis, Indiana), and WBXR (Huntsville, Alabama).

References

External links

ITK
Radio stations established in 1971